Spook School is a nickname given to the Glasgow School from the 1890s to sometime around 1910.

Spook School or The Spook School  may also refer to:

 Glasgow School, artists.
 The Spook School, band.